, also titled Shozo, a Cat, and Two Women, is a 1956 Japanese comedy film directed by Shirō Toyoda. It is based on Jun'ichirō Tanizaki's 1936 novella A Cat, a Man, and Two Women.

Plot
Kitchenware salesman Shōzō shows more affection for his cat Lily than for the people around him. When his disgruntled wife Shinako moves out, his mother Orin, who never got along with her daughter-in-law, encourages him to marry Fukuko, the young daughter of Shōzō's wealthy uncle Nakajima. Fukuko is soon enervated by her future husband's obsessive love for his cat. Shinako talks Fukuko into giving Lily to her, speculating that the couple will fall out with each other over the cat's absence, and that Shōzō will eventually take Shinako back. Although Shōzō and Fukuko do separate after repeated quarrels, he refuses to re-unite with Shinako. Thrown out of his home by Fukuko, whose father paid the mortgage for the house, he walks along the rainy beach, his cat in his arms.

Cast
 Hisaya Morishige as Shōzō
 Isuzu Yamada as Shinako
 Kyōko Kagawa as Fukuko
 Chieko Naniwa as Orin, Shōzō's mother
 Juro Hayashida as Nakajima
 Ashinoya Gangyoku as Kinoshita
 Kyū Sazanka as Soeyama
 Haruo Tanaka as Hagimura
 Michiyo Tamaki as Tamiko
 Yuko Minami as Hatsuko
 Katsue Miyakoya as Matsu

Reception
In his 1959 compendium The Japanese Film – Art and Industry, film historian Donald Richie called A Cat, Shozo, and Two Women "warm, moving, and awfully funny, a winning combination of comedy and impeccable taste".

Awards
Isuzu Yamada received the Kinema Junpo Award for Best Actress, the Mainichi Film Award for Best Actress and the Blue Ribbon Award for Best Actress. Mitsuo Miura was awarded the Mainichi Film Award for Best Cinematography and the Blue Ribbon Award for Best Cinematography.

References

External links
 

Japanese comedy films
Japanese black-and-white films
1956 films
1956 comedy films
Films based on Japanese novels
Films based on works by Jun'ichirō Tanizaki
Films scored by Yasushi Akutagawa
Films directed by Shirō Toyoda
1950s Japanese films